Makhno is a Ukrainian surname, it may refer to multiple people:

Omelian Makhno (d. 1918), Ukrainian veteran of the Russo-Japanese War
Savelii Makhno (1872–1920), Ukrainian anarchist military commander
Hryhorii Makhno (1886–1920), Ukrainian anarchist military commander
Nestor Makhno (1888–1934), Ukrainian anarcho-communist revolutionary and commander of an independent anarchist army in Ukraine during the Russian Civil War of 1917–1922
Elena Mikhnenko (1922–1993), French-Ukrainian exile to Kazakhstan
Vasyl Makhno (born 1964), Ukrainian poet, essayist, and translator
Lesya Makhno (born 1981), Ukrainian-born Russian volleyball player

See also
 
Kim Chwa-chin (1889–1930), sometimes called "Korean Makhno"

Ukrainian-language surnames